The Xuanguang Pier is a pier at Sun Moon Lake in Yuchi Township, Nantou County, Taiwan.

History
Due to the continuing drought which caused water shortage in the lake in early 2021, the pier had to be temporarily closed starting 1 April 2021.

Destinations
The pier serves for destinations to Ita Thao Pier and Shuishe Pier at the other perimeter sides of Sun Moon Lake.

See also
 Transportation in Taiwan

References

Piers in Nantou County